
Quebec is the second-most populous province in Canada with 8,501,833 residents as of 2021 and is the largest in land area at . For statistical purposes, the province is divided into 1,282 census subdivisions, which are municipalities and equivalents. Quebec's 1,218 municipalities include 87 regional county municipalities at the supralocal level and 1,131 local municipalities ( of its census subdivisions). Generally, most local municipalities, as well as some unorganized territories, are nested within regional county municipalities. The 1,218 municipalities are directly responsible for the provision of public transit, fire protection, potable water, water purification, and waste management services to its residents. They also share responsibility with the province in the provision of housing, road networks, police protection, recreation and culture, parks and natural spaces, and land use planning and development.

Below the regional county municipality level, the Government of Quebec's Ministry of Municipal Affairs and Housing recognizes 10 types of local municipalities – cities, towns, village municipalities, parish municipalities, township municipalities, united township municipalities, Cree village municipalities, Naskapi village municipalities, northern village municipalities, and simply "municipalities". Cities and towns are legislated primarily by the Loi sur les cités et villes (Cities and Towns Act). The Cree Villages and the Naskapi Village Act presides over the province's Cree and Naskapi village municipalities, while the Act Respecting Northern Villages and the Kativik Regional Government presides over northern villages. The 5 other types of municipalities are legislated primarily by the Code municipal du Québec (Municipal Code of Quebec). The Municipal Powers Act and 40 other pieces of legislation also apply to municipalities.

Among the remaining 475, there are 230 towns, 43 village municipalities, 135 parish municipalities, 42 township municipalities, 2 united township municipalities, 8 Cree village municipalities, 1 Naskapi village municipality, and 14 northern village municipalities. Despite still being a legal municipal status type, there are no longer any cities in Quebec, although one town is permitted to brand itself as a city in its official name.

Montreal is the province's largest municipality with 1,762,949 residents. Chisasibi, Eastmain, Kawawachikamach, Nemaska, Saint-Louis-de-Gonzague-du-Cap-Tourmente, Waskaganish, Waswanipi, Wemindji, and Whapmagoostui are Quebec's smallest municipalities each with a population of 0.

Regional county municipalities 
A regional county municipality (French: Municipalité régionale de comté) in Quebec is a membership of numerous local municipalities, which in some cases can include unorganized territories, that was formed to administer certain services at the regional level such as waste management, public transit, land use planning and development, property assessment, etc. Its council comprises the mayors of all local municipalities within its membership and in some cases one or more other elected representatives.

Quebec legally recognizes 87 regional county municipalities (RCMs). They had a cumulative population of 3,909,607 in the 2021 Census of Population. The most and least populated of the province's incorporated RCMs are Roussilon with 185,568 residents and Le Golfe-du-Saint-Laurent with 3,382 residents.

Local municipalities 

Quebec's Act Respecting Municipal Territorial Divisions states that a "municipality that is not a regional county municipality is a local municipality." The province's 10 types of local municipalities include cities, towns, village municipalities, parish municipalities, township municipalities, united township municipalities, municipalities, Cree village municipalities, Naskapi village municipalities, and northern village municipalities.

Cities 
City (French: cité) status is no longer officially in use in Quebec. The last municipalities to have city status in Quebec were Dorval and Côte-Saint-Luc. Both held city status until they dissolved to become part of an amalgamated Montreal on January 1, 2002. While both were re-incorporated as towns on January 1, 2006, Dorval retained "City of Dorval" (French: Cité de Dorval) as its name for branding purposes.

Prior to 1988 amendments to the Cities and Towns Act, cities could be formed from any municipality in effect under the Municipal Code of Quebec with a population of 2,000 or more if the municipality:
passed a resolution to formally request the Government of Quebec to change to city status;
published the proposed resolution twice in the provincial gazette;
obtained approval of its voters during an election or through a referendum; and
submitted a petition to the Minister of Municipal Affairs for the letters patent to be granted within two months of the voters' approval that details the population, name, and boundaries of the city as well as the location of its first meeting of city council.

Upon submission of the petition with a certificate signed by the municipality's secretary-treasurer confirming the resolution's approval, the Government of Quebec could hold a public inquiry on the city status application, approve the application by granting the letters patent, and alter the proposed name of the city from the name proposed in the application.

Also prior to the 1988 amendments to the Cities and Towns Act, the Government of Quebec could consider and approve an application for city status from a municipality with a population of less than 2,000 under circumstances it deemed extenuating.

Towns 

Quebec has 230 towns (French: villes) that had a cumulative population of 7,139,693 in the 2021 Census of Population. Quebec's largest and smallest towns by population are Montreal and L'Île-Dorval with populations of 1,762,949 and 30.

Prior to 1988 amendments to the Cities and Towns Act, towns could be formed from any municipality in effect under the Municipal Code of Quebec with a population of 2,000 or more if the municipality:
passed a resolution to formally request the Government of Quebec to change to town status;
published the proposed resolution twice in the provincial gazette;
obtained approval of its voters during an election or through a referendum; and
submitted a petition to the Minister of Municipal Affairs for the letters patent to be granted within two months of the voters' approval that details the population, name, and boundaries of the town as well as the location of its first meeting of town council.

Upon submission of the petition with a certificate signed by the municipality's secretary-treasurer confirming the resolution's approval, the Government of Quebec could hold a public inquiry on the town status application, approve the application by granting the letters patent, and alter the proposed name of the town from the name proposed in the application.

Also prior to the 1988 amendments to the Cities and Towns Act, the Government of Quebec could consider and approve an application for town status from a municipality with a population of less than 2,000 under circumstances it deemed extenuating.

Also prior to 1988 amendments to the Cities and Towns Act, the Government of Quebec could consider and approve an application for city status application from a municipality with a population of less than 2,000 under circumstances it deemed extenuating.

Under current legislation, any towns that were incorporated by special legislation or letters patent prior to September 1, 1979 or incorporated by any charter or letters patent approved under the Cities and Towns Act between September 1, 1979 and May 7, 1996 inclusive are subject to the Cities and Towns Act.

Village municipalities 

In Quebec, a village (French: village) is an "[r]ural agglomeration characterized by a more or less concentrated habitat, possessing essential services and offering a form of community life", while a village parish municipality (French: municipalité de village) is the "[t]erritory of a village erected into a municipality." The Municipal Code of Quebec applies to all village municipalities in Quebec.

Quebec has 43 village municipalities that had a cumulative population of 45,931 in the 2021 Census of Population. Quebec's largest village municipality is Val-David with a population of 5,558, while Kingsbury is province's smallest village municipality with a population of 142.

Parish municipalities 

A parish (French: paroisse) in Quebec is an "[e]cclesiastical district where the jurisdiction of a minister of religion (priest, pastor, etc.) is exercised", while a parish municipality (French: municipalité de paroisse) is the "[t]erritory of a parish erected into a municipality." The Municipal Code of Quebec applies to all parish municipalities in Quebec.

Quebec has 135 parish municipalities that had a cumulative population of 140,794 in the 2021 Census of Population. Quebec's largest and smallest parish municipalities Notre-Dame-du-Mont-Carmel and Saint-Louis-de-Gonzague-du-Cap-Tourmente with populations of 6,121 and 0.

Township municipalities 

In Quebec, a township (French: canton) is an "[t]erritorial unit of a system of division of space, generally rectangular in shape, used for the freehold concession of public lands", while a township municipality (French: municipalité de canton) is the "[t]erritory or part of territory of a township established as a municipality." The Municipal Code of Quebec applies to all township municipalities in Quebec.

Quebec has 42 township municipalities that had a cumulative population of 48,124 and in the 2021 Census of Population. Quebec's largest and smallest township municipalities by population are Shefford and Ristigouche-Partie-Sud-Est with populations of 7,253 and 170.

United township municipalities 

A united township municipality (French: municipalité de cantons unis) in Quebec is the "[t]erritory of two or more neighbo[u]ring townships erected into a municipality." The Municipal Code of Quebec applies to all united township municipalities in Quebec.

Quebec has two united township municipalities that had a cumulative population of 10,002 and in the 2021 Census of Population.

Municipalities 
A municipality (French: municipalité) in Quebec is the "[t]erritory over which a local authority is exercised in accordance with municipal laws." The Municipal Code of Quebec applies to all municipalities in Quebec.

Quebec has 656 municipalities that are simply designated "municipalities". They had a cumulative population of 1,060,877 in the 2021 Census of Population. Quebec's largest and smallest municipalities are Sainte-Sophie and Saint-Benoît-du-Lac with populations of 18,080 and 43.

Cree village municipalities 
In Quebec, a Cree village (French: village cri) is an "[a]gglomeration inhabited mainly by the Crees and located on category 1A lands as defined in the James Bay and Northern Quebec Agreement", while a Cree village municipality (French: municipalité de village cri) is the "[t]erritory over which a local Cree authority is exercised in accordance with the Act respecting the Cree villages and the Naskapi village." The Cree Villages and the Naskapi Village Act applies to all Cree village municipalities in Quebec.

Quebec has 8 Cree village municipalities of which 7 were unpopulated as of the 2021 Census of Population. With 10 residents, Mistissini was Quebec's only populated Cree village municipality as of 2021.

Naskapi village municipalities 
In Quebec, a Naskapi village (French: village naskapi) is an "[a]gglomeration inhabited mainly by Naskapis and located on category 1A-N lands as defined in the Northeastern Quebec Agreement", while a Naskapi village municipality (French: municipalité de village naskapi) is the "[t]erritory over which a Naskapi local authority is exercised in accordance with the Act respecting the Cree villages and the Naskapi village." The Cree Villages and the Naskapi Village Act applies to the province's lone Naskapi village municipality in Quebec.

Kawawachikamach is Quebec's only Naskapi village municipality.

Northern village municipalities 
In Quebec, a northern village municipality (French: municipalité de village nordique) is the "[t]erritory over which local authority is exercised in accordance with the Act respecting northern villages and the Kativik Regional Government." Act Respecting Northern Villages and the Kativik Regional Government applies to all northern village municipalities in Quebec.

The province has 14 northern village municipalities that had a cumulative population of 14,045 in the 2021 Census of Population. Quebec's largest northern village municipality is Kuujjuaq with a population of 2,638, while Aupaluk is province's smallest northern village municipality with a population of 233.

List of local municipalities

See also 

Administrative divisions of Quebec
Classification of municipalities in Quebec
List of census agglomerations in Quebec
List of communities in Quebec
List of designated places in Quebec
List of population centres in Quebec
Municipal history of Quebec

Notes

References 

Local government in Quebec
Municipalities